Eric M. Smith (born ) is a United States Marine Corps general who serves as the 36th assistant commandant of the Marine Corps since 8 October 2021. He most recently served as the deputy commandant for Combat Development and Integration, being succeeded by Karsten Heckl.

Education
Eric Smith is from Plano, Texas. Smith was commissioned as a second lieutenant in the Marine Corps in 1987 through the Naval Reserve Officers Training Corps program at Texas A&M University. During his time at A&M, he was Commander of the Fightin' Texas Aggie Band in the Texas A&M University Corps of Cadets.

Marine career
After completing The Basic School and Infantry Officer's Course, he received assignment to 2nd Battalion, 3rd Marines as rifle platoon commander participating in Operation Desert Shield/Desert Storm. Following a tour as an Officer Selection Officer, he attended the Amphibious Warfare School and then reported to 2nd Battalion, 2nd Marines for duty as Commanding Officer of Weapons and E Companies. During this tour he participated in Operation Assured Response in Monrovia, Liberia. After a tour as a Marine Officer Instructor at Texas A&M University, he attended the United States Army Command and General Staff College. The following assignment was as the Naval Section Chief at the U.S. Military Group in Caracas, Venezuela from 2001 to 2003.

From 2003 until 2006, Smith served in the 1st Marine Division as the Division Operations Officer; Executive Officer of Regimental Combat Team 1; Commanding Officer of 1st Battalion, 5th Marines. During this time, had several deployments to Iraq in support of Operation Iraqi Freedom, including Fallujah in 2004 and Ramadi in 2005. He has also served in the 2nd Marine Division as the Assistant Chief of Staff and the Commanding Officer of 8th Marine Regiment, which was deployed to Afghanistan and was involved in Operation Enduring Freedom. From July to November 2015, he commanded the Marine Corps Forces Southern Command in Miami, Florida. Then he was transferred to the Pentagon to serve as the Senior Military Assistant to the Secretary of Defense.

As a major general, Smith assumed command of the First Marine Division at Camp Pendleton. The division is part of the larger I Marine Expeditionary Force. As commander, he led a hazing crackdown but was rebuked by a military judge.

In May 2018, Smith was nominated for promotion to lieutenant general, and assignment as commanding general of III Marine Expeditionary Force. He received his promotion and assumed command of III MEF in August 2018.

Smith has also participated in Operation Assured Response in Liberia.

On 13 June 2019, Smith assumed responsibility as the Commanding General, Marine Corps Combat Development Command and the Deputy Commandant for Combat Development and Integration.

In July 2021, he was nominated and confirmed for promotion to four-star general and assignment as Assistant Commandant of the Marine Corps, succeeding Gary L. Thomas. He assumed the position from the retiring Gary L. Thomas on October 8, 2021.

Awards and decorations

References

Living people
Recipients of the Defense Distinguished Service Medal
Recipients of the Legion of Merit
United States Marine Corps generals
United States Marine Corps personnel of the Gulf War
United States Marine Corps personnel of the Iraq War
United States Marine Corps personnel of the War in Afghanistan (2001–2021)
Year of birth missing (living people)
Assistant Commandants of the United States Marine Corps